The United Arab Emirates has an embassy in Algiers while Algeria maintains an embassy in Abu Dhabi.

High level visits
In May 2010 when Sultan bin Saeed Al Mansoori, the UAE Minister of Economy, led a delegation to Algeria. A joint statement and Memorandum of Understanding was signed with the Algerian Minister for Finance, Karim Joudi.

During the visit, Al Mansoori met with Algerian Prime Minister Ahmed Ouyahia and talks were made over strengthening bilateral trade relations as well as extending cooperation in the areas of higher education, environment, finance, customs energy, telecommunications and industry. Ouyahia considers the UAE as a gateway to the Middle East for Algeria and a "strategic hub."

There is also a UAE- Algeria Business Council, which aims to encourage bilateral trade and boost investments between both countries. In the energy sector, both sides have discussed the potential for partnerships in oil exploration and studying the possibility of forming common projects in the field of renewable energy.

See also 
 Foreign relations of Algeria
 Foreign relations of the United Arab Emirates

References

External links
 Official website of the Consulate General of Algeria in Dubai

 
United Arab Emirates
Bilateral relations of the United Arab Emirates